Belle da Costa Greene (November 26, 1879 – May 10, 1950) was an American librarian who managed and developed the personal library of J. P. Morgan. After Morgan's death in 1913, Greene continued as librarian for his son, Jack Morgan, and in 1924 was named the first director of the Pierpont Morgan Library. Despite being born to Black parents, Greene spent her professional career passing for white.

Early life
Belle da Costa Greene was born in Washington, D.C. as Belle Marion Greener. Although her birth date is sometimes noted as December 13, 1883, her biographer Heidi Ardizzone lists Greene's birth date as November 26, 1879. Her mother was Genevieve Ida Fleet, a music teacher and member of a well-known African-American family in Washington, D.C. Her father, Richard Theodore Greener, was the first black student and first black graduate of Harvard (class of 1870). He went on to work as an attorney, professor and racial justice activist who served as dean of the Howard University School of Law. Once Greene took the job with Morgan, she likely never spoke to her father again. She may have met him once in Chicago around 1913, but no written records of this meeting are known. Historians long believed that Richard Greener had lost most of his papers in the 1906 San Francisco earthquake.

After her parents' separation, the light-skinned Belle, her mother, and her siblings passed as white and changed their surname to Greene to distance themselves from their father. Her mother changed her maiden name to Van Vliet in an effort to assume Dutch ancestry. Belle also made a change to her name, swapping out Marion for 'da Costa,' and began claiming a Portuguese background to explain her darker complexion. The changes to her and her family's stated ancestry resulted in further fabrications, including one that led people to believe Greene had been raised in Virginia. The true nature of her background was further complicated by Greene claiming to be younger than she actually was, an action biographer Heidi Ardizzone referred to as "a masquarade" in response to a youth focused society that viewed single women past a certain age "disdained."

Career
Greene began working at the Princeton University Library in 1902. It was during this time that she was trained in cataloguing and reference work, and developed a growing knowledge of rare books. She met Junius Spencer Morgan II while working at the Princeton library, who later introduced her to his financier uncle J. P. Morgan.
Greene began working as J. P. Morgan's personal librarian in 1905.

Greene's first task as librarian was to organize, catalogue and shelve Morgan's collection. Ada Thurston, an experienced bibliographer, contributed to the effort as Greene's personal assistant. By 1908, Greene began representing Morgan abroad.  Trusted for her expertise (Greene was an expert in illuminated manuscripts) as well as her bargaining prowess with dealers, Greene spent millions of dollars buying and selling rare manuscripts, books, and art for Morgan. She told Morgan – who was willing to pay any price for important works – that her goal was to make his library "pre-eminent, especially for incunabula, manuscripts, bindings, and the classics." In a 1912 profile about Greene, the New York Times referred to her "force of persuasion and intelligence," and recounted her pre-auction purchase of seventeen highly sought after William Caxton books on behalf of the Morgan library. She was particularly focused on making rare books accessible to the public, rather than locked away in the vaults of private collectors. She was quite successful in this regard- for instance, when the Morgan Library became a public institution and she was named its first director in 1924, she celebrated by mounting a series of exhibitions, one of which drew a record 170,000 people. In a history of American art auctions, Greene was described as having a "a wild, gay humour" notably distinguishing her from Morgan's more serious demeanor.

J. P. Morgan's biographer Jean Strouse described an example of the relationship between Morgan and Greene: "Morgan hated paying customs duties, especially on art objects, and, like countless of other travelers before and since, evaded them whenever possible. He quickly enlisted Greene as an ally in tax evasion. One year she managed, by artfully letting the customs agents find several dutiable items of hers in her luggage, to draw their attention away from a painting, three bronzes, and a very expensive watch he had asked her to buy in London. "`When I landed at the library with all of JP's treasures ...,' she reported to a friend, 'well he & I did a war dance & laughed in great glee.'"

After Morgan's death in 1913, Greene continued on in her role working for his son J. P. Morgan Jr. Morgan left her a sum of fifty thousand dollars in his will, enough capital for her to live on comfortably, though she continued to supplement her inheritance with the $10,000 a year salary that she earned at the library- a huge sum in those days, especially for a woman. In 1924 she was named director of the Pierpont Morgan Library, following the transition of Morgan's formerly personal collection to a public institution. She retired from the position in 1948. When she died in 1950 the New York Times referred to her as the "one of the best known librarians in the country."

In 1949—one year after she retired and the year before she died—the Morgan Library staged an exhibition of over 250 of the best items that Belle had purchased, which she attended while in a wheelchair.

Beyond her library role, Greene took on various positions within the profession. She was one of the first women named as a fellow of the Mediaeval Academy of America and was a fellow in perpetuity with the Metropolitan Museum of Art. Greene also served on the editorial boards of Gazette des Beaux Art and ARTnews.

Personal life
Greene never married. Her mother, Genevieve, lived with her for decades and Greene played an active role in raising her nephew Robert Mackenzie Leveridge, who had been born in her home. In 1913, J. P. Morgan left Greene $50,000 in his will. Asked if she was Morgan's mistress, Greene is said to have replied, "We tried!" She had a lasting romantic relationship with the Renaissance Italian art expert Bernard Berenson, whom she met in 1909.

Greene died on May 10, 1950, at St. Luke's Hospital in New York City. Greene destroyed her personal papers before her death but records held by others persist, including letters written to Berenson. Her professional correspondence is also archived in the collections of The Morgan Library & Museum. "Her body was ... cremated and the ashes buried in Kensico Cemetery, Valhalla, New York."

Popular culture
The 2021 book The Personal Librarian by Marie Benedict and Victoria Christopher Murray features a historical fiction account of Greene's personal and professional life as J. P. Morgan's librarian.

References

Bibliography
 Ardizzone, Heidi. An Illuminated Life: Belle da Costa Greene's Journey from Prejudice to Privilege (W.W. Norton, 2007).

Notes

Further reading

External links
 "A Look at Belle da Costa Greene". Rare Book Collections @ Princeton (August 3, 2010)
 

Burials at Kensico Cemetery
American women librarians
American librarians
African-American librarians
Princeton University librarians
1870s births
1950 deaths
Fellows of the Medieval Academy of America
20th-century African-American people
20th-century African-American women